Valiantsina Valiancinaŭna Kaminskaya, also Valentyna Kaminska, (born September 5, 1987, in Mahilyow) is a Belarusian (until 2018) and Ukrainian (since June 2018) cross-country skier. She competed at the 2014 Winter Olympics, 2018 Winter Olympics, and 2022 Winter Olympics.

Biography
Kaminskaya started her international career in 2007 when she competed at the Junior World Ski Championships in Tarvisio, finishing 69th in 10 km pursuit and 82nd in 5 km freestyle.

Kaminskaya made her World Cup debut on February 2, 2012, in Moscow, when she finished 38th in sprint. While competing for Belarus, her best World Cup finish was 37th in a freestyle sprint race in Ryabinsk during the 2014–15 season. As of January 2022, this result still remains her best individual World Cup finish.

Kaminskaya competed at the 2014 Winter Olympics for Belarus. She placed 47th in the qualifying round in the sprint, failing to advance to the knockout stages. She competed at the 2018 Winter Olympics where she took part in four events. At those Games, Kaminskaya was the only one in her team born Belarus.

Kaminskaya's transition to the Ukrainian team was announced in June 2018. On November 24, 2018, Kaminskaya debuted for Ukraine at the World Cup stage in Ruka where she was 61st in sprint.

In 2022, Valiantsina Kaminskaya was nominated for her third Winter Games in Beijing as a member of Ukrainian national team. She finished 79th in the 10 km event, 70th in the women's sprint qualification, and was part of the relay team which finished 18th. Kaminskaya failed a doping test and was suspended during the Olympics on 16 February.

Kaminskaya participated at three World Championships: in 2013 (for Belarus), 2019, and 2021 (both for Ukraine). Her best personal performance was 42nd in 30 km mass start in 2021. She also took part at the 2009 Winter Universiade, with her best personal result being 24th in sprint.

Cross-country skiing results
All results are sourced from the International Ski Federation (FIS).

Olympic Games

World Championships

World Cup

Season standings

References

1987 births
Living people
Olympic cross-country skiers of Belarus
Olympic cross-country skiers of Ukraine
Cross-country skiers at the 2014 Winter Olympics
Cross-country skiers at the 2018 Winter Olympics
Cross-country skiers at the 2022 Winter Olympics
Doping cases in cross-country skiing
Competitors at the 2009 Winter Universiade
People from Mogilev
Belarusian female cross-country skiers
Ukrainian female cross-country skiers
Naturalized citizens of Ukraine
Belarusian emigrants to Ukraine
Ukrainian sportspeople in doping cases
Sportspeople from Mogilev Region